During the 1993–94 English football season, Ipswich Town competed in the FA Premier League.

Season summary
Ipswich Town looked to improve on their 16th-place finish of the previous campaign. Their initial form was promising, and in November they held Manchester United to a goalless draw at Old Trafford. But, as had happened a season earlier, their late season form took a dramatic slump and they found themselves in a relegation battle. The 5-1 home defeat to Arsenal was Ipswich's worst home defeat in 18 years.

Ipswich failed to win their last 11 games but their survival was secured on the final day of the season after fellow strugglers Sheffield United were beaten by a late goal by Chelsea and Oldham Athletic failed to beat Norwich City.

Kit
Ipswich Town's kit was manufactured by English company Umbro and sponsored by Ipswich-based chemical manufacturer Fisons.

First-team squad
Squad at end of season

Left club during season

Reserve squad

Competitions

FA Premier League

League table

Legend

Ipswich Town's score comes first

Matches

FA Cup

League Cup

Transfers

Transfers in

Transfers out

Loans out

Awards

Player awards

References

Ipswich Town F.C. seasons
Ipswich Town F.C.